Mohammad Abul Kalam is a Bangladesh Nationalist Party politician and the former Member of Parliament of Noakhali-10.

Career
Kalam was elected to parliament from Noakhali-10 as a Bangladesh Nationalist Party candidate in 1979.

References

Bangladesh Nationalist Party politicians
Living people
2nd Jatiya Sangsad members
Year of birth missing (living people)